Darleys Gregorio Pérez Ballesta (born September 14, 1983) is a Colombian professional boxer who held the WBA lightweight title in 2015. As an amateur he represented Colombia at the 2008 Summer Olympics as a lightweight.

Amateur career
At the South American Games 2006 he won the gold medal vs Éverton Lopes (13:11). At the PanAm Games 2007 he lost at a qualifier (13:16) and the quarterfinals of the main event to world champion Yordenis Ugás (4:8) in a tight contest.

At the 2007 World Amateur Boxing Championships he upset heavy favourite Olexandr Klyuchko (13:10) and knocked out two successive opponents but lost to Kim Song Guk from North Korea {6:23} in the final. He clinched a berth at the Beijing Olympics in 2008, narrowly losing to eventual gold medallist Aleksei Tishchenko at the quarter-finals stage. He turned professional in 2009 following his Olympic campaign, with an impressive amateur record of 82 wins and 7 losses.

Professional career
Darleys Pérez turned professional in 2009, where he competes in the lightweight division. Following a string of knockout victories over domestic Colombian fighters, Pérez debuted in America where he defeated a number of lightweight contenders to earn a shot at the WBA Interim Lightweight title against former super-featherweight champion Yuriorkis Gamboa, also undefeated. In an uninspired yet close contest, Gamboa edged the Colombian over the distance to hand Pérez his first loss in 28 fights. However, Pérez fought for the WBA Interim Lightweight title once again two fights later and won the belt with a decisive points victory over Argenis Lopez, before being promoted to WBA Lightweight champion due to Richar Abril being stripped of his title in 2015. Pérez' first defence of the WBA belt came against tough underdog Anthony Crolla in Manchester, where Crolla sought to win the world title following a life-threatening injury sustained in an incursion with burglars the previous Christmas. In a competitive yet controversial bout, many thought Crolla had done enough to secure a decision victory but Pérez was fortunate to come away from Manchester with a draw on the cards. A rematch subsequently followed in Manchester, during which Crolla upset Pérez by knocking him out with a crisp body punch in the 5th round, taking the Colombian's WBA belt in the process. Pérez followed up the second loss of his career with a knockout win over domestic rival Ubadel Soto in Colombia to take his record to 33 wins, 2 losses and 1 draw.

Professional boxing record

External links
 
 
 
 South Americans 2006
 PanAm Games
 World 2007
 yahoo data

|-

Living people
Lightweight boxers
Boxers at the 2007 Pan American Games
Boxers at the 2008 Summer Olympics
Olympic boxers of Colombia
1983 births
Pan American Games competitors for Colombia
Colombian male boxers
South American Games gold medalists for Colombia
South American Games medalists in boxing
Competitors at the 2006 South American Games
Sportspeople from Antioquia Department
21st-century Colombian people